Larch Mountain may refer to:

 Larch Mountain (Washington County, Oregon)
 Larch Mountain (Multnomah County, Oregon)
 Larch Mountain (Clark County, Washington)
 Larch Mountain (Thurston County, Washington)
 Larch Mountain (Kootenai County, Idaho)
 Larch Mountain (Shoshone County, Idaho)